Let's Play Darts is a charity sports show hosted by Gabby Logan. The show sees celebrities team up with professional darts players to play five rounds of darts before announcing a winner. The winner from each quarter-final episode goes through to the semi-final rounds.

Episode guide

Series 1 (2015)
The series was filmed on 3–4 September, and aired in early March in the lead-up to the Comic Relief fundraiser marathon.

The series also featured Comic Relief appeal films from Lenny Henry, Liza Tarbuck, Emma Willis and Angela Griffin as well as presenter Gabby Logan.

Participants

Matches

Quarter-finals
The quarter-final matches were aired between 1 and 4 March 2015. Each match was the best of 9 legs (or the first to 5 legs).

Semi-finals
The semi-final matches were aired on 5 and 6 March 2015. Each match was the best of 11 legs (or the first to 6 legs).

Final
The Final was aired on 8 March 2015. It was the best of 15 legs (or the first to 8 legs).

Series 2 (2016)
It was announced on 8 October 2015 that the programme will return for a second series for Sport Relief on 21 February 2016 and will feature brand new competitors, including the return of the "Punaway Train" from last year, Tim Vine. Vassos Alexander announced that Deta Hedman's partner was Jon Richardson.

Participants

Matches

Quarter-finals
The quarter-final matches were aired on 21 and 28 February 2016. Each match was the best of 9 legs (or the first to 5 legs).

Semi-finals
The semi-final matches were aired on 6 March 2016. Each match was the best of 11 legs (or the first to 6 legs).

Final
The Final was aired on 13 March 2016. It was the best of 15 legs (or the first to 8 legs).

Transmissions

External links

2015 British television series debuts
2016 British television series endings
BBC Television shows
Charity events in the United Kingdom
Comic Relief
English-language television shows
Sport Relief
Television series by Banijay
Television series by Zeppotron